Fregona is a comune (municipality) in the Province of Treviso in the Italian region Veneto, located about  north of Venice and about  north of Treviso. 
 
Fregona borders the following municipalities: Caneva, Cappella Maggiore, Cordignano, Alpago, Sarmede, Tambre, Vittorio Veneto.

Twin towns
Fregona is twinned with:

  Seyssel, Ain, France, since 1992

References

Cities and towns in Veneto